The transmission-line matrix (TLM) method is a space and time discretising method for computation of electromagnetic fields. It is based on the analogy between the electromagnetic field and a mesh of transmission lines. The TLM method allows the computation of complex three-dimensional electromagnetic structures and has proven to be one of the most powerful time-domain methods along with the finite difference time domain (FDTD) method.

Basic principle 

 The TLM method is based on Huygens' model of wave propagation and scattering and the analogy between field propagation and transmission lines. Therefore, it considers the computational domain as a mesh of transmission lines, interconnected at nodes. In the figure on the right is considered a simple example of a 2D TLM mesh with a voltage pulse of amplitude 1 V incident on the central node. This pulse will be partially reflected and transmitted according to the transmission-line theory. The reflection coefficient and the transmission coefficient are given by

 

 

The energy injected into the node by the incident pulse and the total energy of the scattered pulses are correspondingly

 

 

Therefore, the energy conservation law is fulfilled by the model.

The next scattering event excites the neighbouring nodes according to the principle described above. It can be seen that every node turns into a secondary source of spherical wave. These waves combine to form the overall waveform. This is in accordance with Huygens principle of light propagation.

In order to show the TLM schema we will use time and space discretisation. In case  the value  will be used, which is the lattice constant. In this case the following holds:

 

where  is the free space speed of light.

The 2D TLM node

The scattering matrix of an 2D TLM node 

 

 

 

We can combine these equations to obtain

 

The figure on the right presents a structure referred to as a series node. If the voltages on the ports are considered, and the polarity from the above figure holds, then the following is valid

 

where .

 

 

and dividing both sides by 

 

Since  and substituting  gives

 

This reduces to Maxwell's equations when .

Similarly, using the conditions across the capacitors on ports 1 and 4, it can be shown that the corresponding two other Maxwell equations are the following:

 

 

Having these results, it is possible to compute the scattering matrix of a shunt node. Replacing the four line segments from the above figure with their Thevenin equivalent it is possible to show that the following equation for the reflected voltage pulse holds:

 

If all incident waves as well as all reflected waves are collected in one vector, then this equation may be written down for all ports in matrix form:

 

For a series node the scattering matrix S has the following form

Connection between TLM nodes 

In order to describe the connection between adjacent nodes by a mesh of series nodes, look at the figure on the right. As the incident pulse in timestep k+1 on a node is the scattered pulse from an adjacent node in timestep k, the following connection equations are derived:

 

 

 

 

By modifying the scattering matrix  inhomogeneous and lossy materials can be modelled. By adjusting the connection equations it is possible to simulate different boundaries.

The shunt TLM node 

Apart from the series node, described above there is also the shunt TLM node, which represents a TM-mode field distribution. With similar considerations as for the series node the scattering matrix of the shunt node can be derived.

3D TLM models 

Most problems in electromagnetics require a three-dimensional grid. As we now have structures that describe TE and TM-field distributions, intuitively it seems possible to define a combination of shunt and series nodes providing a full description of the electromagnetic field. Such attempts have been made, but because of the complexity of the resulting structures they proved to be not very useful. Using the analogy that was presented above leads to calculation of the different field components at physically separated points. This causes difficulties in providing simple and efficient boundary definitions. A solution to these problems was provided by Johns in 1987, when he proposed the structure known as the symmetrical condensed node (SCN), presented in the figure on the right. It consists of 12 ports because two field polarisations are to be assigned to each of the 6 sides of a mesh cell.

The topology of the SCN cannot be analysed using Thevenin equivalent circuits. More general energy and charge conservation principles are to be used.

The electric and the magnetic fields on the sides of the SCN node number (l,m,n) at time instant k may be summarised in 12-dimensional vectors

 

 

They can be linked with the incident and scattered amplitude vectors via

 

 

The relation between the incident and scattered waves is given by the matrix equation

 

The scattering matrix S can be calculated. For the symmetrical condensed node with ports defined as in the figure the following result is obtained

 

where the following matrix was used

 

The connection between different SCNs is done in the same manner as for the 2D nodes.

Open-sourced code implementation of 3D-TLM 
The George Green Institute for Electromagnetics Research (GGIEMR) has open-sourced an efficient implementation of 3D-TLM, capable of parallel computation by means of MPI named GGITLM and available online.

References 

 C. Christopoulos, The Transmission Line Modeling Method: TLM, Piscataway, NY, IEEE Press, 1995. 
 Russer, P., Electromagnetics, Microwave Circuit and Antenna Design for Communications Engineering, Second edition, Artec House, Boston, 2006, 
 P. B. Johns and M.O'Brien. "Use of the transmission line modelling (t.l.m) method to solve nonlinear lumped networks", The Radio Electron and Engineer. 1980.
 J. L. Herring, Developments in the Transmission-Line Modelling Method for Electromagnetic Compatibility Studies, PhD thesis, University of Nottingham, 1993.
 Mansour Ahmadian, Transmission Line Matrix (TLM) modelling of medical ultrasound PhD thesis, University of Edinburgh 2001

Computational electromagnetics
Electromagnetism
Electrodynamics